Morro Peak is a small  mountain summit located in Jasper National Park in Alberta, Canada. It is located at the northwest end of the Colin Range, which is a sub-range of the Canadian Rockies. The nearest higher peak is Hawk Mountain,  to the southeast. Morro Peak was named in 1916 by Morrison P. Bridgland for the Spanish word morro, meaning rounded hill, which is an apt description of it. Bridgland (1878-1948) was a Dominion Land Surveyor who named many peaks in Jasper Park and the Canadian Rockies. The mountain's name was officially adopted in 1956 by the Geographical Names Board of Canada.


Climate

Based on the Köppen climate classification, Morro Peak is located in a subarctic climate zone with cold, snowy winters, and mild summers. Winter temperatures can drop below -20 °C with wind chill factors below -30 °C. In terms of favorable weather, June through September are the best months to climb. Precipitation runoff from Morro Peak flows into the Athabasca River.

See also
 Geography of Alberta

References

Gallery

External links
 Weather forecast: Morro Peak
 Parks Canada web site: Jasper National Park

One-thousanders of Alberta
Canadian Rockies
Mountains of Jasper National Park
Alberta's Rockies